John Poulett, 4th Earl Poulett, KT (3 April 1756 – 14 January 1819), styled Viscount Hinton between 1764 and 1788, was a British peer and militia officer.

Poulett was the son of Vere Poulett, 3rd Earl Poulett, by Mary Butt, daughter of Richard Butt, of Arlington, Gloucestershire. From 22 January 1779 until 1798 he was Colonel of the East Devon Militia, which was on active service in home defence until 1783.

He succeeded his father in the earldom in 1788. In 1792 he was appointed Lord Lieutenant of Somerset, a post he held until his death. He was also a Recorder of Bridgwater. The East Devon Militia was again embodied, under his colonelcy, for active service in March 1794, and he was also commissioned colonel of the Somersetshire Fencible Cavalry. On 30 May, he was invested a Knight of the Thistle. He was appointed a Lord of the Bedchamber to George III on 19 November 1795, an office he held until his death. When the colonel of the 1st Somerset Militia died, Poulett as lord lieutenant took personal command as colonel of the regiment on 25 October 1798. He was also commissioned as colonel of the East Somerset Regiment of Yeomanry Cavalry on 17 September 1803.

Lord Poulett married firstly Sophia Pocock, daughter of Admiral Sir George Pocock, in 1782. They had ten children, including Vice-Admiral the Honourable George Poulett, father of William Poulett, 6th Earl Poulett. One daughter, Lady Sophia Poulett, was the wife of Henry Vane, 2nd Duke of Cleveland, while another daughter, Lady Mary Poulett, was the second wife of Lord Charles Somerset. After Sophia's death in January 1811 Poulett married secondly Margaret Burges, daughter of Ynyr Burges and widow of Sir John Smith-Burges, 1st Baronet, in 1816. He died in January 1819, aged 62, and was succeeded in the earldom by his eldest son, John. The Countess Poulett died at Brighton on 28 May 1838.

References

1756 births
1819 deaths
Devon Militia officers
Somerset Militia officers
British Yeomanry officers
Knights of the Thistle
Lord-Lieutenants of Somerset
4
Burials at the Poulett mausoleum, Church of St George (Hinton St George)
John, 4th Earl